Young Thor is an American-Canadian action-adventure video game developed by Frima Studios and published by Sony Computer Entertainment. Like Zombie Tycoon, it is produced with the participation of Telefilm Canada. It was first released on July 20, 2010 as a downloadable PlayStation Network title for the PlayStation Portable and PlayStation 3. Young Thor is about the childhood of the eponymous Norse god, Thor, as he embarks on a quest to save the world tree, Yggdrasil. The game was met with mixed or average reviews from critics upon release.

Gameplay

The game is a side-scroller beat 'em up and is broken up into four levels. Players control the Norse god Thor and unleash his lightning magic and powerful hammer, Mjölnir, to blast any foes in his way. As the game progresses, Thor gains XP which increases his character stats; however, the stats are not customizable, leading Joystiq to comment, "leveling seems to exist for the sole purpose of encouraging replays. Somebody out there will want to achieve a level 100 character, right?" Each level introduces new types of enemies and new complicated platform layouts. Treasures are hidden in certain levels which, if found, grant Thor powers such as extra health and magic regeneration, or the ability to double jump. Levels must be repeated multiple times both to find the treasures and to gain enough experience to defeat tougher enemies in later levels. To explain the Norse mythology present in the game, as the game progresses players unlock dictionary entries which can be accessed through the extras section of the game's menu.

Plot
The game follows the Norse god Thor as he travels through Midgard and Asgard on a quest to restore balance to the world. The three Norns charged with keeping the world tree Yggdrasil – Urd, Skuld, and Verdandi – are being held captive by Hel and her two accomplices Níðhöggr and Ratatoskr. Yggdrasil will die if the Norns do not return, and with its death Hel will gain great power. Thor thus embarks on a quest to find eight godly artifacts that will help him defeat the captors and rescue the Norns.

Development
Young Thor is the second PlayStation Portable mini developed by Frima Studio, the first being Zombie Tycoon released on October 29, 2009. The game was shown at the Sony Computer Entertainment Europe booth at E3 2010, a video game trade fair held in Los Angeles, California in June 2010. Young Thor was released in the PlayStation Store on July 20, 2010. In November 2010, Sony created a "Western Game Buyer Selection" on the PlayStation Network in Japan to offer Western-developed digitally distributed games to the Japanese market. Young Thor was translated and localized for Japanese players, and was among the first three games to be released in this section of the PlayStation Network.

Reception

Young Thor was met with mixed or average reviews upon release, garnering an aggregate score of 71/100 on Metacritic. Joystiq's Andrew Yoon enjoyed the scaling levels but thought the game was too short: "I anticipated a far grander adventure, especially after the impressive, voiced opening cutscene raised my expectations."

References

External links

2010 video games
Action-adventure games
Frima Studio games
Norse mythology in popular culture
PlayStation Network games
PlayStation Portable games
PlayStation Portable-only games
Single-player video games
Sony Interactive Entertainment games
Video games based on Norse mythology
Video games developed in Canada